Front Range Passenger Rail is a proposed inter-city passenger train service along the Front Range and broader I-25 corridors in Colorado and Wyoming. Most proposals envision a route from Pueblo north to Colorado Springs, Denver, Boulder, Fort Collins, and usually Cheyenne. Extensions south to Trinidad, Albuquerque, and even El Paso have been discussed.

Front Range communities were historically connected by rail transit until the mid-20th century. A series of studies performed since the early 2000s have shown mounting interest in renewed service. Momentum has grown significantly in the 2020s with Colorado creating the Front Range Passenger Rail District and Amtrak including the route in its 15-year expansion vision.

History

In the 19th century, the Atchison, Topeka and Santa Fe Railway and Denver and Rio Grande Western Railroad each built lines along the Front Range (now owned by BNSF and Union Pacific, respectively). Pueblo–Denver passenger service existed until the formation of Amtrak in 1971. The Denver–Cheyenne segment was last served in 1997 by the Pioneer.

In 1989, rail supporters involved in preserving Denver Union Station formed the nonprofit Colorado Rail Passenger Association (ColoRail). The group has regularly advocated for the Front Range route, and in 1997 played a role in starting Amtrak Thruway bus service along the corridor from Denver to Raton.

With the 1998 Transportation Equity Act for the 21st Century, Congress authorized the US Department of Transportation to designate eleven federal high-speed rail corridors for targeted development. Ten were listed by the December 2001 funding deadline, though none in the mountain west. In March 2002, the Colorado Department of Transportation (CDOT) nevertheless applied for designation of the "Rocky Mountain High Speed Rail Corridor" along I-25 and I-70. The corridor has yet to be designated.

Rocky Mountain Rail Authority

In December 2004, Colorado State Representative Bob Briggs of Westminster founded the Front Range Commuter Rail organization. The stated goal of the organization was to start commuter rail along the Front Range by the time the Regional Transportation District's FasTracks mass transit started service in 2014. The proposed line was dubbed the "RangerXpress" and received high-profile support from Colorado Senator Ken Salazar.

In September 2006, the Colorado Transportation Commission approved a $1,246,000 grant for a high-speed rail feasibility study on corridors in Colorado, including the Front Range. Although Front Range Commuter Rail had applied for the grant, CDOT required that the money go to a local government body. To this end, several counties and municipalities in Colorado formed the Rocky Mountain Rail Authority (RMRA) that November. The authority eventually grew to 45 members. By May 2007, the RMRA had raised over $415,000 in matching funds, exceeding the required 20% match on the CDOT grant. RMRA committed the final $325,000 the following month.

Work on the RMRA study began in June 2008 and it was released in March 2010. It found that the I-25 corridor would meet the Federal Railroad Administration (FRA) criteria for technical and economic feasibility, including positive cost-benefit and farebox recovery ratios.

In July 2011, the Colorado Secretary of State marked Front Range Commuter Rail as a delinquent organization effective June 1, 2010.

Division of Transit and Rail

In May 2009, Colorado Governor Bill Ritter signed a bill creating the Division of Transit and Rail (DTR) within CDOT. The division is responsible for developing rail services and administering state and federal rail funds in Colorado. In March 2012, DTR released its first Colorado Freight and Passenger Rail Plan, which was required by the Passenger Rail Investment and Improvement Act of 2008 in order for Colorado to receive future FRA grants. The plan lists various versions of Front Range service as long-range projects.

In April 2012, CDOT began an Interregional Connectivity Study (ICS) through an FRA grant, building on the 2010 RMRA study. Published in January 2014, the ICS recommended initial high-speed rail service between Fort Collins, Denver International Airport, and Briargate—a neighborhood of northern Colorado Springs—with future expansion to Pueblo. This alignment would bypass Boulder and downtown Denver via a new rail line built along the Colorado 470 beltway. The startup cost of the project was estimated at $9.81 billion with annual ridership of 13.6 million.

In July 2015, CDOT began operating Bustang, an intercity bus service with several routes along the Front Range corridor.

In July 2016, the Regional Transportation District (RTD) opened the initial  section of the B Line from Denver to Westminster. An unfunded extension to Boulder and Longmont is planned for the 2040s. This commuter rail line overlaps part of the route that later emerged as the favorite for Front Range Passenger Rail.

Rail Commission

In spring 2017, Colorado enacted legislation creating the Southwest Chief & Front Range Passenger Rail Commission, effective July 1st of that year. The commission subsumed a body focused solely on supporting the long-distance Southwest Chief, taking on the additional task of developing passenger rail on the I-25 corridor. It is composed of representatives from CDOT, RTD, ColoRail, Amtrak, BNSF, Union Pacific, and various Colorado governments. In 2018 the General Assembly allocated $2.5 million toward the commission's duties, including development of a Front Range Passenger Rail service plan.

CDOT updated the Colorado Freight and Passenger Rail Plan in 2018, naming Front Range Passenger Rail a "priority objective" and "Colorado's most immediate opportunity to improve and expand rail mobility." The Division of Transit and Rail committed to advancing the project.

In December 2020, the Rail Commission published an "Alternatives Analysis" that identified three feasible routes for the Pueblo–Fort Collins segment of Front Range service. Annual ridership was estimated at 2.2 million and startup costs at $7.8 to $14.5 billion.

In spring 2021, Amtrak included the Front Range route in its 2035 expansion vision. As envisioned, the service would consist of three daily round trips between Pueblo and Fort Collins with one extending to Cheyenne. The end-to-end trip time would be 5 hours 34 minutes and the route would have an annual economic impact of $103 million. This would be a state-supported Amtrak route similar to Illinois Service or NC By Train, meaning Colorado and Wyoming would shoulder much of the operating cost.

Rail District

In June 2021, Colorado Governor Jared Polis signed a bill creating the Front Range Passenger Rail District in a ceremony at Pueblo Union Depot. The district spans all thirteen counties of the I-25 corridor in Colorado. It will be overseen by a board of stakeholders similar to those of the Southwest Chief & Front Range Passenger Rail Commission, which the district officially replaces on July 1, 2022. Notably, the board can ask voters to approve a new sales tax up to 0.8% within the district to pay for the train service, but only after making every effort to secure federal funding.

In October 2021, the Colorado Transportation Commission approved the final $1.6 million of the $3.9 million needed for new Front Range service studies. The FRA had already awarded a $685,000 grant and the rest came from the Rail Commission. The studies will take about two years and result in a workable service plan that the Rail District can use to secure funding. The project would still need separate environmental review.

In November 2021, Congress passed President Biden's Infrastructure Investment and Jobs Act (IIJA), which allocates $215 million to public transportation in Colorado, $66 billion to Amtrak, and tens of billions to competitive transportation grant programs. Advocates think Front Range Passenger Rail is positioned to benefit from these funds. In May 2022, the FRA launched the Corridor Development Program as the mechanism for new passenger rail projects to receive funds from the IIJA. Colorado's four Democratic House members sent a letter to USDOT and the FRA requesting that Front Range service be funded by the program.

In June 2022, Colorado allocated nearly $9 million in "early stage Front Range Passenger Rail funding." $2.4 million went to the rail district, providing matching dollars for federal contributions. $6.5 million went toward the Burnham rail yard redevelopment project in Denver. The move was geared toward making Colorado competitive for federal IIJA funding.

New Mexico and Texas
In 2003, New Mexico Governor Bill Richardson announced plans for the Rail Runner Express, a commuter train between Belen, Albuquerque, and Santa Fe. To ensure passenger trains would have priority over freight, the state signed a $76 million agreement with BNSF in December 2005 to buy the line between Belen and Lamy. As part of the deal, BNSF insisted that the state also buy the line from Lamy to Trinidad, Colorado, that hosts the Southwest Chief and has been included in some plans for Front Range Passenger Rail expansion. Governor Susana Martinez cancelled the purchase of this part of the line in March 2016.

The American Recovery and Reinvestment Act of 2009 appropriated new funding for high-speed rail projects, renewing interest a possible "Rocky Mountain High Speed Rail Corridor". Colorado, New Mexico, and Texas sought designation for the Denver–Albuquerque–El Paso section of the I-25 corridor. In July 2009, in hopes of conducting a feasibility study, the states applied for $5 million in funds made available by the Passenger Rail Investment and Improvement Act of 2008. No study materialized.

References

External links
 

Commuter rail in the United States
Passenger rail transportation in Colorado
Passenger rail transportation in New Mexico
Passenger rail transportation in Wyoming
Proposed railway lines in Colorado
Rail advocacy organizations in the United States
Proposed Amtrak routes